Misverstand Dam is a combined gravity & arch type dam located on the Berg River, near Porterville, Western Cape, South Africa. It was established in 1977 and serves mainly for municipal and industrial use. The hazard potential of the dam has been ranked significant (2).

See also
List of reservoirs and dams in South Africa
List of rivers of South Africa

References 

 List of South African Dams from the Department of Water Affairs and Forestry (South Africa)

Dams in South Africa
Dams completed in 1977